The Kunst Museum Winterthur (The Winterthur Museum of Art) is an art museum in Winterthur, Switzerland run by the local Kunstverein. From its beginnings, the activities of the Kunstverein Winterthur were focused on  contemporary art – first Impressionism, then Post-Impressionism and especially Les Nabis, through post-World War II and recently created works by Richard Hamilton, Mario Merz and Gerhard Richter.

Building
Architects Rittmeyer & Furrer designed the original museum in 1915, and a 1000 m2 modernist addition was designed by Gigon/Guyer in 1995.

The building "Beim Stadthaus" also contains Winterthur's natural history museum.

Collection
The main focus of the museum's collection has always been impressionism and post-impressionism. The impressionist gallery includes such notable works as:
Low Tide, Claude Monet (1882)
Under Hampton Court Bridge, Alfred Sisley (1874)
Horse chestnuts of Jas de Bouffan, Paul Cézanne (1885)
Dandelions, Vincent van Gogh (1889)

A sculpture gallery includes works by Eugène Delacroix and Alberto Giacometti. The cubism section contains works by Pablo Picasso, Mondrian, and Gris, as well as one of the most important European collections of Fernand Léger.

More modern works include pieces by Mark Tobey, Ellsworth Kelly, Brice Marden, Andro Wekua and Pia Fries.

See also
 Am Römerholz

References

External links

 

Art museums and galleries in Switzerland
Museums in the canton of Zürich
Winterthur
Museums established in 1915
1915 establishments in Switzerland
Neoclassical architecture in Switzerland